Morpeth is a suburb of the city of Maitland in the Hunter Region of New South Wales, Australia. It is on the southern banks of the Hunter River at the border between the City of Maitland and Port Stephens Council LGAs. The major population centre, where almost all residents of the suburb reside, is the historical town of Morpeth which takes its name from Morpeth, Northumberland, near Newcastle upon Tyne, in England.

History

The traditional owners and custodians of the Maitland area are the Wonnarua people.

The town of Morpeth was initially created through the private actions of Edward Charles Close, who selected a property of 1,000 hectares and developed it as a river port from 1831-1841. The lieutenant built his house, known as Closebourne, on the property. A two-storey Georgian home made of sandstone, the house became an episcopal residence from 1848-1912.

The river port grew steadily throughout the 1830s. St James's Church, located on Tank Street, was built from 1837 to 1840 and was partly designed by John Horbury Hunt is now a Local Government Heritage listing. A major merchant at this time was James Taylor, who built a bond store circa 1850 near the bridge that is now heritage-listed. Morpeth Court House was built circa 1861 in a Greek Revival style and a local police station followed in 1879. The construction of the Great Northern Railway in 1857, bypassing Morpeth, meant that Newcastle developed as the regional port. Morpeth became less significant commercially, but still survived as a township with its own history and heritage.

Today, the town is a popular tourist destination due to its many historical buildings and river bank setting.

Heritage listings 
Morpeth has a number of heritage-listed sites, including:
 102 Main Road: Morpeth Bridge
 Morpeth Road: Morpeth House and Closebourne House
 19 Tank Street: St James' Anglican Church
 90 Swan Street: Morpeth Railway Station

Gallery

Notes

  The Australian Bureau of Statistics Census Collection District of Morpeth only includes the township. It excludes persons living on some rural properties close to the township in the remainder of the suburb as well as in newer residential areas of the suburb near the township. This means that the actual population of Morpeth is slightly higher than shown.
  Average elevation of the suburb as shown on 1:100000 map 9232 NEWCASTLE.
  Area calculation is based on 1:100000 map 9232 NEWCASTLE.

References

 
Suburbs of Maitland, New South Wales
Towns in the Hunter Region
1821 establishments in Australia
Hunter River (New South Wales)